The 1977 USC Trojans football team represented the University of Southern California (USC) in the 1977 NCAA Division I football season. In their second year under head coach John Robinson, the Trojans compiled a 8–4 record (5–2 against conference opponents), finished in a tie for second place in the Pacific-8 Conference (Pac-8), and outscored their opponents by a combined total of 357 to 212. The team was ranked #12 in the final UPI Coaches Poll and #13 in the final AP Poll.

Quarterback Rob Hertel led the team in passing, completing 132 of 245 passes for 2,145 yards with 19 touchdowns and 18 interceptions.  Charles White led the team in rushing with 285 carries for 1,478 yards and seven touchdowns. Randy Simmrin led the team in receiving with 41 catches for 840 yards and five touchdowns.

Schedule

Roster

Game summaries

UCLA

References

USC
USC Trojans football seasons
Bluebonnet Bowl champion seasons
USC Trojans football